Nicolae Vasile (born 29 December 1995) is a Romanian professional footballer who last played for Arandina CF in the Spanish Tercera División. He debuted in Liga I for Rapid in the 1-0 win against CSMS Iaşi.

Career

Club
On 9 September 2016, Vasile signed for PS Kemi on a contract until the end of the 2017 season.

References

External links
 
 

1995 births
Living people
FC Rapid București players
Kemi City F.C. players
UE Sant Julià players
Romanian footballers
Romania under-21 international footballers
Romania youth international footballers
Romanian expatriate footballers
Footballers from Bucharest
Liga I players
Veikkausliiga players
Association football defenders
Expatriate footballers in Finland
Expatriate footballers in Andorra
Arandina CF players